Christine McPeters Auten is an American voice actress, ADR director, and ADR scriptwriter who works for Funimation, ADV Films and Sentai Filmworks.

Auten performs the voice of Esdeath, the main antagonist from the popular anime Akame ga Kill, Mesousa from Pani Poni Dash, Kurenai from Samurai Gun, Yufan Xia from Full Metal Panic: The Second Raid, Priscilla Asagiri from Bubblegum Crisis Tokyo 2040, and Sakaki from Azumanga Daioh.

Personal life
As of 2017, she lives in Austin, Texas with her husband Andrew Auten.

Filmography

Anime

Films

References

External links

2005 interview of Christine Auten (archived)

American voice actresses
Living people
American voice directors
American television writers
American women screenwriters
American women television writers
Actors from Huntsville, Alabama
Actresses from Alabama
Actresses from Austin, Texas
Writers from Austin, Texas
20th-century American actresses
21st-century American actresses
20th-century American writers
21st-century American writers
American film actresses
20th-century American women writers
21st-century American women writers
Writers from Huntsville, Alabama
Screenwriters from Texas
Screenwriters from Alabama
Year of birth missing (living people)